People who served as the mayor of the Municipality of Botany and the City of Botany Bay are:

References

Mayors Botany
Botany, Mayors
Mayors of Botany